The 1958 Troy State Red Wave football team represented Troy State College (now known as Troy University) as a member of the Alabama Intercollegiate Conference (AIC) during the 1958 NAIA football season. Led by fourth-year head coach William Clipson, the Red Wave compiled an overall record of 3–6, with a mark of 1–2 in conference play.

Schedule

References

Troy State
Troy Trojans football seasons
Troy State Red Wave football